Pedro Requena (born 29 June 1961) is a Peruvian footballer. He played in 51 matches for the Peru national football team from 1983 to 1992. He was also part of Peru's squad for the 1983 Copa América tournament.

References

External links
 

1961 births
Living people
Peruvian footballers
Peru international footballers
Association football defenders
Sportspeople from Callao